Ugen is both a given name and surname. Notable people with the name include:

 Lorraine Ugen (born 1991), English long jumper and sprinter
 Ugen Tenzin (born 1966), Bhutanese politician